, also known as HBC, is a Japanese broadcast network affiliated with the Japan News Network (JNN). Their headquarters are located in Hokkaidō.

HBC was established on November 30, 1951; radio broadcasts officially commenced on March 10, 1952 and TV broadcasts commenced on April 1, 1957, as the first commercial television station in Hokkaido.

History 
After the passage of the Three Radio Acts (Radio Act, Broadcasting Act, and Act on the Establishment of Radio Supervisory Board) in 1950, there was a movement to apply for the establishment of private broadcasting in Hokkaido. On April 21, 1951, Hokkaido Broadcasting was granted the preparatory license and became one of the first 16 private broadcasters to receive a broadcasting license. On November 30 of the same year, Hokkaido Broadcasting was officially registered as a company with its headquarters in the Daimaru Building (which was the headquarters for the wholesale company, Daimaru Corporation).

On March 10 of the following year, HBC started radio broadcasting operating for at least 16 hours every day.
November 30, 1951: HBC is founded.
January 19, 1952: HBC conducts test transmissions.
March 10, 1952: Regular radio broadcasts commence.
1954: TV transmission tests are conducted in Hakodate.
April 1, 1957: Regular TV broadcasts commence.
August 1959: HBC signs an exclusive agreement with JNN.
March 18, 1966: Color broadcasts commence.
June 1, 2006: Digital terrestrial broadcasts commence.
June 24, 2011: Analog terrestrial broadcasts conclude.

Network 
 TV: Japan News Network (JNN)
 RADIO: Japan Radio Network (JRN), National Radio Network (NRN)

Stations

Analog TV

Digital TV (ID:1) 
Sapporo (Main Station) JOHR-DTV 19ch
Hakodate JOHR-DTV 17ch
Asahikawa JOHR-DTV 19ch
Obihiro JOHR-DTV 19ch
Kushiro JOHR-DTV 19ch
Abashiri JOHR-DTV 19ch
Kitami JOHR-DTV 32ch
Muroran JOHR-DTV 22ch

RADIO 
Sapporo (Main Station) JOHR 1287 kHz
Hakodate JOHO 900 kHz
Asahikawa JOHE 864 kHz
Obihiro JOHW 1269 kHz
Kushiro JOQL 1404 kHz
Abashiri JOQM 1449 kHz
Kitami JOQN 801 kHz
Muroran JOQF 864 kHz

Program 
 TV
 RADIO

Rival Stations 
Sapporo Television Broadcasting(STV)
Hokkaido Television Broadcasting(HTB)
Hokkaido Cultural Broadcasting(uhb)
TV Hokkaido(TVh)

References

External links

 HBC Official Site

Japan News Network
Television stations in Japan
Radio in Japan
Television channels and stations established in 1957
Mass media in Sapporo